Fadol Brown (born April 15, 1993) is an American football defensive end for the DC Defenders of the XFL. Brown signed with the Oakland Raiders as an undrafted free agent in 2017. He also played for the Green Bay Packers.

Professional career

Oakland Raiders
Brown signed with the Oakland Raiders as an undrafted free agent on May 5, 2017. He was waived on September 2, 2017 and was signed to the Raiders' practice squad the next day. He signed a reserve/future contract with the Raiders on January 2, 2018.

In 2018, Brown played in eight games before being waived on December 4, 2018.

Green Bay Packers
On December 5, 2018, Brown was claimed off waivers by the Green Bay Packers. He was re-signed on March 6, 2019. He was waived on October 5, 2019.

Chicago Bears
On October 15, 2019, Brown was signed to the Chicago Bears' practice squad. He was placed on the practice squad/injured list on October 29. His practice squad contract with the team expired on January 6, 2020.

DC Defenders 
On November 17, 2022, Brown was drafted by the DC Defenders of the XFL. He was placed on the team's reserve list on March 16, 2023.

NFL career statistics

References

External links
Ole Miss bio

1993 births
Living people
American football defensive ends
Ole Miss Rebels football players
Oakland Raiders players
Green Bay Packers players
Chicago Bears players
DC Defenders players
People from Charleston County, South Carolina
Players of American football from South Carolina